was a daimyō (lord) of Izumo Province.

After his father's sudden death in 1560, he became the head of the clan to continue the fight against the Mōri clan. While besieged in Gassantoda Castle, Yoshihisa had a retainer, Uyama Hisakane executed after fearing betrayal. This caused most of his remaining troops to desert and on 1566, he surrendered to Mōri Motonari. Yoshihisa was permitted to become a monk and was held captive at Enmeiji. As a monk, Yoshihisa changed his name to Yurin (友林). After Mōri Terumoto became the head of Mōri clan, he became a retainer under Terumoto.

Family
 Father: Amago Haruhisa
 Mother: daughter of Amago Kunihisa
 Wife: daughter of Kyogoku clan
 Son: Amago Tomohisa
 Adopted son: Amago Motosato (1572-1622)

References

1540 births
1610 deaths
Daimyo
Amago, Yoshihisa